The Goldback is a family of local currencies operating in four U.S. states and launched by Goldback, Inc. in Utah in 2019. Goldbacks contain a thin layer of gold within a polymer coating.

Overview

Goldbacks are shaped like regular currency notes but contain 24K pure gold. The gold is safely contained between two layers of clear polyester, which add artistic elements to the fractional gold bullion they contain. The term Goldback refers to each unit of the currency and is 1/1000 of an ounce of pure gold. The Goldbacks are issued in denominations of 1, 5, 10, 25, and 50, each containing proportionally larger amounts of gold. The notes are minted by Valaurum, a regulated and certified private mint which mints gold products for various governments across the world.  Valaurum uses a proprietary and patented vacuum deposition process to fuse gold atomically together into thin sheets encased in a plastic film designed to hold the gold. Since the launch of the Goldback, the company also sells a leather wallet designed for Goldbacks. 
Initially funded by a lease of Gold from the United Precious Metals Association, with approximately US$1,000,000 in gold, demand has grown from $100k per month, to over a million USD per month in sales. More than US$20 million worth of Goldbacks have been manufactured and circulated, although an up-to-date market cap is not published. While it is sold as a local currency only in four regions, they have been purchased as a gold product, or for their collector's value, worldwide.

The Utah goldback was launched in 2019, with series for Nevada, New Hampshire, and Wyoming launching in 2020, 2021, and 2022, respectively.

Reported use

KSL 5 TV, the NBC affiliate of Salt Lake City, reported local businesses seeing a surge of people using Goldbacks in everyday transactions. Reuters has reported as of 2022 that as many as "a quarter to half of small businesses in Utah will accept the [Goldback] notes". Meanwhile, Nevada has seen some buyers purchasing Goldbacks as part of an inflation hedge investment vehicle.

In association with members of the libertarian Free State Project in New Hampshire, widespread use has been reported of people spending Goldbacks on various goods and services within the state.

Design

Each Goldback features a feminine figure, symbolically representing a cardinal virtue. Which virtues are represented and how they are represented varies according to the state series and region it serves. While each series is different in design, they are all interchangeable and contain the same amount of gold. The size and shape of each bill can also tell part of the story of money. The 1GB is the same size and shape as some Early American currency, The 25GB note is identical in size to a Federal Reserve note, with the 50GB note the size of an old Gold certificate. The 5GB and 10GB notes are proportionally larger than the one and smaller than the 25. This enables most wallets to comfortably hold Goldbacks.

The Utah series depicts the virtues of Liberty, Victory, Justice, Truth, and Prudence. The Nevada series depicts the virtues of Liberty, Fortitude, Justice, Wisdom, and Charity, while the New Hampshire series depicts the virtues of Liberty, Fortitude, Foresight, Truth, and Grace (or Gratitude). All three Series also feature animals and plants native to the states.

Legal status

The Legal status of the Goldback varies from state to state, as local currencies are not addressed by federal law.  The creation of the Utah Goldback was inspired by the Passage of the Utah Legal Tender Act which provides for the adoption of gold and silver as legal tender by the state. The Utah Goldback has not been formally adopted by the state government and is privately issued, but the proponents of the currency claim that as a form of gold bullion produced by a recognized and regulated private mint it falls under the legal tender provisions of the act. This seems to have been affirmed by the Utah Legislature on March 25, 2022. The Utah State Legislature expanded on the definition of legalized gold for legal tender—explicitly making gold with a "polymer holder" or "coating" is not subject to the state sales tax—specifically any metal that, "...has a gold, silver, or platinum metallic content of 50% or more, exclusive of any transparent polymer holder, coating, or encasement..." Future legislation or litigation may be necessary to establish the legal limits of Goldback as state legal tender. The Goldback also serves as a note or bill for redemption in U.S. Minted Legal tender Gold coins at the vaults of the United Precious Metals Association, and is therefore backed by Legal Tender money under state and federal law, regardless of its independent status as gold money.

The first Goldbacks were made for Utah, partly as a result of the legalization of gold and silver as legal tender in Utah in 2011 as part of the Utah Legal Tender Act, and partly because the founder and first employees were based out of Utah, which has a strong culture of precious metals collecting and appreciation.

In contrast to prior concepts and attempts at achieving a gold or silver common medium of exchange, such as the Liberty dollar, the Goldback considered the possibility of legal issues from its inception. With this in mind, the company behind the Goldback built-in features to ensure that Goldbacks cannot be confused with government issued legal tender, such as the United States dollar. One effort the company also took in order to avoid issues with Federal counterfeit laws or being perceived as a threat to dollar hegemony was to print terms on each Goldback such as, "Voluntary negotiable instrument" and "For circulation in Utah", "For circulation in New Hampshire", or "For circulation" specific to whichever state the particular Goldback in question was 'printed' for. Also, the text "Privately Issued, Not U.S. Dollar Legal Tender. US & International Patents Pending" appears on each Goldback (of all denominations and states of issue).

The makers of the Goldback contract with another firm, Oregon-based Valaurum, to manufacture the Goldback. Valaurum says of the above concern:

Criticism

Some commentators have stated that one potential downside of the Goldback is the premium that each Goldback costs over the spot price of gold embedded within each note.

See also
 List of community currencies in the United States
 Cryptocurrency
 Fiat money
 Liberty dollar (private currency)
 Utah Legal Tender Act

References 

Private currencies
Currencies introduced in 2019
2019 establishments in Utah
Local currencies of the United States